Lauro Antonio Ferreira da Silva, (born June 20, 1973 in Alegrete, Rio Grande do Sul), known as just Lauro, is a Brazilian footballer who plays as a Midfielder for Esportivo de Bento Gonçalves.

Team and clubs
 Juventude: 1993 - 1997
 Palmeiras: 1998
 Juventude: 1998 - 2001
 Etti Jundiaí: 2001
 Grêmio: 2002 - 2003
 Palmeiras:  2004
 Ulbra: 2004
 Juventude: 2004 - 2010
 Esportivo: 2010 - current

Honours
 Campeonato Brasileiro Série B: 1994 - Juventude
 Campeonato Gaúcho: 1998 - Juventude
 Copa do Brasil: 1999 - Juventude

External links
Profile at Globo Esporte's Futpedia

1973 births
Living people
People from Alegrete
Brazilian footballers
Grêmio Foot-Ball Porto Alegrense players
Sociedade Esportiva Palmeiras players
Esporte Clube Juventude players
Association football midfielders
Sportspeople from Rio Grande do Sul